Stree Sahasam ( Women's Adventure) is a 1951 Telugu-language swashbuckler film, produced and directed by Vedantam Raghavayya under the Vinoda Pictures banner. It stars Akkineni Nageswara Rao and Anjali Devi , with music composed by C. R. Subburaman.

Plot
Once upon a time, there was a kingdom, its King Mahavira (C.S.R.) announces Swayamvaram i.e. one's own choice of selecting bride to his son Prince Raja Sekhara (Akkineni Nageswara Rao), without his wish. Princesses of various kingdoms arrive for the ceremony, where Raja Sekhara makes 3 conditions for them. The bride should build a diamond palace for him without the help of her parents or in-laws, she should become pregnant with him without his knowledge, and she should allow him to marry the girl he loves. Princess Manohari (Anjali Devi) agrees to it and marries him. Soon after, Raja Sekhara reaches Pakshirajyam along with his friend Ammanna (Relangi), where he falls in love with Pakshiraja's daughter Komali (Girija) and in her association, he forgets Manohari. On the other side, to keep her promise, Manohari performs the dance programs to build the diamond palace. Meanwhile, she finds the whereabouts of Raja Sekhara and immediately reaches Pakshirajyam along with her friend Rani (Surya Prabha), where its commander in chief Dandayya mistakes Rani as the Queen and Manohari as the maid. As Dandayya is attracted to Rani, he requests Manohari to make acquaintance with the Queen, then Manohari makes a condition to build a diamond Palace for her and he does so.

At the same time, Pakshiraja suffers from an ulcer on his back which does not heal from any treatment, so, he announces that whoever gets medicine for it, will make his daughter's marriage with him. On that night, Manohari and Rani in disguise as men, see Raja Sekhara and Komali in the garden when they come to know about the illness of the King and also listen to the remedy for it through bird speakers. After facing many troubles, they achieve the medicine, cure the King's disease and take Komali away. Knowing this, Raja Sekhara faints when Rani takes him to their place, in the darkness, he mistakes Manohari as Komali and sexually interacted with her. The next day morning, Manohari leaves that place and goes back to her in-law's house. Meanwhile, Dandayya silently observes the movement of Raja Sekhara and Komali and captures them. He keeps Raja Sekhara in the prison and forces Komali to marry him by keeping her in a cave. Eventually, Ammanna releases Raja Sekhara and they return to their kingdom. Rani follows Dandayya, with the help of Pakshiraja she protects Komali and gets Dandayya arrested. By the time Raja Sekhara reaches their kingdom, Manohari gives birth to a baby boy. Seeing it, Raja Sekhara becomes furious and orders his men to burn her. The rest of the story is about how Manohari proves her honor.

Cast
Akkineni Nageswara Rao as Raja Sekara
Anjali Devi as Manohari
CSR Anjaneyulu as Mahavira Maharaju
Relangi as Ammanna
Kasturi Siva Rao 
Rama Murthy
Seetharam
Sadasiva Rao
Girija as Komali 
Surya Prabha as Rani
Annapurna
Vijaya Lakshmi

Crew
Art: Vaali, Godgaonkar
Dialogues - Lyrics: Samudrala Sr
Playback: P. Leela
Music: C. R. Subburaman
Editing: P. V. Narayana
Cinematography: B. S. Ranga  
Choreography - - Director: Vedantam Raghavayya
Producer: D.L. Narayana
Banner: Vinoda Pictures
Release Date: 9 August 1951

Soundtrack

The music was composed by C. R. Subburaman. Lyrics were written by Samudrala Sr. There are 15 songs in the film but playback singers are not known.

References

Films based on Indian folklore
Indian black-and-white films
Films scored by C. R. Subbaraman